Man's Way with Women is a 1934 Swedish romantic drama film directed by Per-Axel Branner. It is based on the Finnish novel The Song of the Blood-Red Flower by Johannes Linnankoski.

The interior shots of the film were shot in Råsunda's Filmstaden studios and the exterior scenes in Uppland, Ramsele and Långsele. The film premiered at the Röda Kvarn theatre in Stockholm on November 12, 1934. The film US release was in 1937.

Cast
 Edvin Adolphson as Olof Koskela
 Inga Tidblad as Kyllikki
 Birgit Tengroth as "Dark Eye"
 Anna Lindahl as "Motherwort"
 Gull-Maj Norin as "Gazelle"
 Marianne Löfgren as Elliina Virttanen
 Aino Taube as Annikki
 John Ekman as Olof's father
 Gertrud Pålson-Wettergren as Olof's mother
 Anders Henrikson as Antti, Kyllikki's cousin
 Sven Bergvall as Kyllikki's father

References

External links
 
 Svensk Filmdatabas: Sången om den eldröda blomman (1934) (in Swedish)

1934 films
1934 romantic drama films
Swedish romantic drama films
1930s Swedish-language films
Films based on Finnish novels
1930s Swedish films